Salvage Corps came into existence in the 19th century.  With the growth of cities, fires and insurance, underwriters in several cities established fire fighting services to reduce losses.  As municipal fire brigades became more competent in the 20th century, the private fire companies cut back their services and emphasised salvaging property after the regular firemen had done their job.  

Most were disbanded in the late 20th century including:
Boston Protective Department (1859–1959)
Glasgow Salvage Corps (Raised: November 1873 – Disbanded: 1 April 1984)
Liverpool Salvage Corps (1842–1984)
London Salvage Corps (1865–1982)
New York Fire Patrol (1839–2006)
Chicago Fire Insurance Patrol (1857–1959)
Underwriters Salvage Corps (Mobile, Alabama)
Underwriters Salvage Corps (Cincinnati, Ohio)
Underwriters Salvage Corps (St Louis, Missouri) (1873–1955) 
Underwriters Fire Patrol (San Francisco, California) (1875–1943)
As of August 1995, the Bombay Fire Salvage Corps were still in business.

References
While the flames raged, by Emmons E. Douglass 

History of firefighting
Fire departments
Salvage corps